Gerald Thomas Bergan (January 26, 1892 – July 12, 1972) was an American clergyman of the Roman Catholic Church. He served as bishop of the Diocese of Des Moines in Iowa (1934–1948) and archbishop of the Archdiocese of Omaha in Nebraska (1948–1969).

Biography

Early life 
Gerald Bergan was born on January 26, 1892, in Peoria, Illinois, to William and Mary (née O'Connell) Bergan. After graduating from Spalding Institute in Peoria he attended St. Viator College in Bourbonnais, Illinois, where he excelled in athletics. Bergan continued his studies at the Pontifical North American College in Rome. 

Bergan was ordained to the priesthood for the Diocese of Peoria on October 28, 1915. Upon his return to the United States, he served as chancellor and vicar general of the diocese, and rector of the Cathedral of St. Mary of the Immaculate Conception.

Bishop of Des Moines 
On March 24, 1934, Bergan was appointed the third bishop of the Diocese of Des Moines by Pope Pius XI. He received his episcopal consecration on June 13, 1934, from Cardinal George Mundelein, with Bishops Joseph Schlarman and Henry Rohlman serving as co-consecrators. He established a diocesan newspaper called The Messenger. At the eighth National Eucharistic Congress in 1941, he spoke on labor-management relations, asserting that the employer must permit workers to engage in collective bargaining. He also called for a single union for both labor and capital, and suggested that long-serving employees should have a share in the management of an enterprise.

Archbishop of Omaha 
Bergan was named by Pius XII as the second archbishop of the Archdiocese of Omaha on February 7, 1948. During his administration, more than $80 million was spent for new Catholic schools, churches, and hospitals in the archdiocese. This caused him to become known as the "building bishop". Between 1962 and 1965, Bergan attended all four sessions of the Second Vatican Council in Rome.

Retirement and legacy 
On June 11, 1969, Pope Paul VI accepted Bergan's resignation as archbishop of Omaha and appointed him as Titular Archbishop of Tacarata. He resigned his titular see on January 28, 1971.

Gerald Bergan died in Omaha on July 12, 1972, at age 80. Bergan Mercy Medical Center in Omaha and Archbishop Bergan High School in Fremont, Nebraska, are named in his honor.

References

1892 births
1972 deaths
People from Peoria, Illinois
Participants in the Second Vatican Council
Pontifical North American College alumni
Roman Catholic archbishops of Omaha
American Roman Catholic clergy of Irish descent
Roman Catholic bishops of Des Moines
Roman Catholic Diocese of Peoria
Religious leaders from Illinois
Catholics from Illinois
20th-century Roman Catholic archbishops in the United States